Stanley John Reed (more commonly known as Bertie Reed; 19 January 1943 – 18 December 2006) was a South African yachtsman. He was the first South African to complete three singlehanded circumnavigations.

Life
Reed was born in Port Elizabeth in 1943.

He joined the South African Navy in 1961 and served for 21 years. He started sailing whilst in the Navy.

In the 1982/83 BOC Challenge race he placed second in the Knysna built yacht, Voortrekker. At the time Voortrekker was 14 years old and considered obsolete.

In the 1986–87 race he was placed 7th, sailing Stabilo Boss, a yacht subsequently raced as Maiden.

He was awarded South Africa's highest civilian award for bravery, the Wolraad Woltemade Decoration for his rescue of sailor John Martin whose yacht sank after hitting a submerged iceberg in the Southern Ocean during the 1990–91 BOC Challenge.

In 2006 he was inducted into the Single-Handed Sailors' Hall of Fame.

He received Springbok colours 5 times for sailing.

Death
He died at his home in Gordon's Bay from cancer.

In 2009 a bronze bust of Bertie Reed, by local Cape Town sculptor Charl Frank, was unveiled at the Victoria & Alfred Waterfront by Sir Robin Knox-Johnson.

References

1943 births
2006 deaths
Deaths from cancer in South Africa
South African Navy personnel
People from Port Elizabeth
Sportspeople from Port Elizabeth
South African male sailors (sport)
IMOCA 60 class sailors
1989 Vendee Globe sailors
South African Vendee Globe sailors
Single-handed circumnavigating sailors